Zarez was a Croatian biweekly newsprint magazine covering literature, arts, culture and current affairs.

History and profile
Zarez was established in 1999 after a group of intellectuals decided to break away from the government-favored cultural magazine Vijenac because of differences of editorial policies proscribed by Matica hrvatska, the publisher of Vijenac, and the views of the editorial staff. They formed a company called Druga strana (The other side) and started a new, independent, cultural magazine first published on 19 February 1999. Even though it is widely considered to be one of the best cultural publications in Croatia, it always struggled to secure its finances because of low circulations of culture-oriented publications in the country. It is currently financed by the Croatian Ministry of Culture and the City of Zagreb.

See also
 List of magazines in Croatia

References

External links
 Official website

1999 establishments in Croatia
Cultural magazines
Magazines published in Croatia
Croatian-language magazines
Magazines established in 1999
Mass media in Zagreb
News magazines published in Europe
Biweekly magazines